Thorntons Gap is a historic feature in the Hervey Range, North Queensland, where a walking track that provided access to goldfields crossed the range.

History
Like many places in North Queensland in the 1860s, Townsville was an isolated community and there were no roads to anywhere of which to speak. The remote mining camps that began to spring up along the Burdekin River were accessed by trails connecting ancient aboriginal walking tracks. One such track over Herveys Range west of Townsville provided steep but usable access to the goldfields, particularly to Keelbottom Creek and the township of Dalrymple. The place where this track crossed the range came to be known as Thorntons Gap.

Currently the journey to the top of the range from Townsville, possible in 30 minutes in a car, but in those early days took three days. The first day took travellers to a small hotel on the banks of the Alice River. There was no running water, and travellers bathed in the creek. The second day's travel took one to the base of the range where travellers rested at the Range Inn before tackling the bullock trail through Thorntons Gap. The journey up the range was an arduous one and took the entire day. Once at the top the Eureka Hotel provided a welcome respite. The Eureka Hotel is now known as the Herveys Range Heritage Tea Rooms.

See also

History of Queensland

References

Mountain passes of Australia
Townsville